Sibusiso Khumalo (born 8 September 1989) is a South African professional soccer player who plays as a  defender for Black Leopards.

References

External links

1989 births
2011 CAF U-23 Championship players
African Games silver medalists for South Africa
African Games medalists in football
Association football defenders
Living people
South African Premier Division players
National First Division players
Kaizer Chiefs F.C. players
Mamelodi Sundowns F.C. players
Moroka Swallows F.C. players
SuperSport United F.C. players
Cape Town Spurs F.C. players
TS Sporting F.C. players
Black Leopards F.C. players
South African soccer players
Sportspeople from Durban
Zulu people
Competitors at the 2011 All-Africa Games
South Africa international soccer players